Joseph "Clayne" Crawford (born April 20, 1978) is an American actor. He is best known for his roles as Martin Riggs on the Fox series Lethal Weapon (2016–2018) and Teddy Talbot on the SundanceTV series Rectify (2013–2016), the latter earning him a nomination for the Critics' Choice Television Award for Best Supporting Actor in a Drama Series. He has also had supporting roles in the films A Walk to Remember (2002), Swimfan (2002), A Love Song for Bobby Long (2004), The Great Raid (2005), and Wristcutters: A Love Story (2006).

Early life
Joseph Crawford was born in Clay, Alabama, on April 20, 1978, the son of Lennie and design engineer Brian Crawford. He graduated from Hewitt-Trussville High School, where he was on the football and wrestling teams.

Career
In 1996, Crawford moved to Los Angeles to look for acting work. He took construction jobs to support himself while appearing in small theaters. In 2000, to distinguish himself from others with a similar name, he stopped using the name "Joey Crawford" and began appearing with the name "Clayne Crawford". He created his new first name by taking the name of his hometown (Clay, Alabama) and combining it with the word "clan" in honor of an ancestor. He had a recurring role in the first season of Jericho as Mitchell "Mitch" Cafferty. In 2008, he appeared on Life in the episode "Evil ... and His Brother Ziggy". Crawford was the protagonist in the 2010 straight-to-DVD prequel to Smokin' Aces, Smokin' Aces 2: Assassins' Ball. In 2010, he had a recurring role in the eighth season of 24 as Kevin Wade, a young, mysterious man. He also appeared in the first and second season of the A&E series The Glades. 

Crawford played the role of Ted "Teddy" Talbot Jr. in the first SundanceTV original series, Rectify, which was aired for four seasons from 2013 to 2016. The series, exploring a man who is released from prison after 19 years on death row after DNA evidence appears to support his innocence, also looks at the effects on his family and town. It received critical praise and won a Peabody Award in 2014, also receiving notice for its treatment of issues in criminal justice. Crawford played the role of Cade LaSalle, older brother to Christopher LaSalle on NCIS: New Orleans.

Beginning in 2016, Crawford portrayed Martin Riggs in the Fox television reboot Lethal Weapon. In May 2018, amidst reports of bad behavior and hostility between cast and crew on the show's set, Crawford was fired after two seasons and replaced with a new character played by Seann William Scott. His co-star, Damon Wayans, quit the series shortly afterwards.

Filmography

Film

Television

Awards
2016 Critics' Choice Television Award for Best Supporting Actor in a Drama Series (nominated)

References

External links

1978 births
Living people
People from Clay, Alabama
Male actors from Alabama
American male film actors
American male television actors
20th-century American male actors
21st-century American male actors